Diogo Matos Ribeiro (born 27 October 2004) is a Portuguese swimmer. He is the world junior record holder in the long course 50-metre butterfly.

At the 2022 FINA World Junior Swimming Championships, held in Lima, Peru starting on 30 August, Ribeiro won the gold medal in the 50-metre butterfly with a world junior record, Championships record, and Portuguese record time of 22.96 seconds, which was 0.09 seconds faster than the former world junior record of 23.05 seconds set by Andrey Minakov of Russia in 2020. He also won the gold medal in the 100-metre butterfly, with a time of 52.03 seconds, and the gold medal in the 50-metre freestyle, with a time of 21.92 seconds.

World junior records

Long course metres (50 m pool)

References 

2004 births
Living people
S.L. Benfica (swimming)
Place of birth missing (living people)
Portuguese male freestyle swimmers
Mediterranean Games gold medalists for Portugal
Mediterranean Games silver medalists for Portugal
Mediterranean Games medalists in swimming
Swimmers at the 2022 Mediterranean Games
21st-century Portuguese people
Sportspeople from Coimbra
European Aquatics Championships medalists in swimming